PharmaSat Risk Evaluation Satellite (or PRESat) nanosatellite, for NASA, was about the size of a loaf of bread, weighed about  and was constructed in just six months.

Spacecraft 
PRESat, 3U CubeSat, contains a micro-laboratory with a controlled environment packed with sensors and optical systems that can detect the growth, density and health of yeast cells. PRESat was to demonstrate its ability to create a stable, space science laboratory using innovative environment control techniques, and to monitor the levels of pressure, temperature and acceleration.

Launch 
The satellite was lost in the failure of the third Falcon 1 launch, on 3 August 2008, at 03:34 UTC.

Mission 
Although NASA was not able to test this payload in space, NASA mission managers and payload engineers achieved success in this low-cost mission by rapidly pulling together expertise from across the agency to develop, build and ground-test a fundamental space biology micro-laboratory. The communications team also successfully established a fully operational South Pacific Ground Communication System using two ground stations, which were transported and installed at Kwajalein Atoll in the Marshall Islands and at the Universidad Centroamericana in El Salvador.

This mission was to  provides an excellent opportunity for collaboration between two NASA centers, other government agencies, academia and the burgeoning space industry. Through the development of PRESat, NASA gained experience and knowledge it can apply to future small and nanosatellite missions.

See also 

 List of CubeSats

References 

Satellite launch failures
Spacecraft launched in 2008
CubeSats
SpaceX payloads contracted by NASA
Space accidents and incidents in the United States